Channing Pollock (August 16, 1926 – March 18, 2006) was an American magician and film actor.

Biography
Channing Pollock was the son of Robert Burns Pollock and Marjorie Leppert. While his parents atteneded a lecture of famed playwright Channing Pollock, the author noticed that Majorie was with child. After finding out that the couple shared the same last name, he joked that the baby should be named after him. The famed author died before his name sake became famous. 

After serving in the US Navy during World War II, Channing married his childhood sweetheart, Naomi Phelps, a daughter of a preacher man. He first became interested in magic after reading Professor Hoffmann's Modern Magic in his early 20s. Pollock used his G.I. Bill to study at the Chavez School of Magic in La Verne, California from which he graduated in 1952. After graduating from the famed Chavez School of Magic in Hollywood, California, Naomi soon became his partner on stage until their divorce in 1959. The marriage produced one son, Russell. 

His second marriage was to Josephine (Jozy) Bolton from England on January 13, 1960, to her knight in shining armor. Jozy soon became his onstage partner as well, being forced to wear a brunette wig. The marriage became rocky and they divorced in 1968

Career

Magician
Pollock was recognized as one of the most sophisticated and charismatic practitioners of his craft.  Strikingly handsome with an enigmatic stage presence, he was best known for an act in which he would elegantly produce doves out of thin air, and he was often billed as "the most beautiful man in the world".  Pollock's early work as a magician was on the nightclub circuit, where his talents were enhanced by his good looks.

Pollock was skilled with sleight of hand and card manipulation. He appeared on The Ed Sullivan Show in 1954, and went on to make several appearances at the London Palladium. By the mid-1950s Pollock was unsurpassed in his field, and he had spawned a great many imitators. But his act was unique, and the excitement in his routine was so tied up with his own personality (he always made a point of never smiling until he was taking his final bow) that copyists never had quite the same impact.

In 1954 the Academy of Magical Arts and Sciences awarded him Magician of the Year.

He appeared at cabaret venues and in special shows all over the world, performing for President Dwight D. Eisenhower, Queen Elizabeth II and at the wedding of Prince Rainier and Grace Kelly. At the height of his career he was one of America's highest-paid entertainers. He taught his act to his chauffeur in London, Frank Brooker, who went on performing the act for several years under the name of Franklyn.

While in Rome doing movies, he appeared on Italian TV doing magic. On his return to America, he was not able to secure work as an actor so he returned to doing magic by touring with Liberace. 

After his divorce with Jozy, Pollock re-married to Corrie Shoong in 1968 and soon retired. However, it was not official until he did his last performance on his friend Peter Pit's television show, “Watch Closely” later that year. In retirement, he and his new wife Cori, visited the Magic Castle in Hollywood, California as well many magic conventions. He made brief appearances on various television shows doing card fans. On the 1996 television show called Champions of Magic, Pollock even produced a dove for Princess Stephanie of Monaco.

Actor
In 1959 his act was seen in the film European Nights, and the following year he decided to give up his career as a magician to become an actor. He appeared in a number of thrillers and dramas, including Musketeers of the Sea (1962), with Aldo Ray and Pier Angeli; Lo sceicco rosso (1962);  (1963); and Georges Franju's Judex (1963), in which he played the title character. According to  Jacques Champreux, grandson of Louis Feuillade and co-scenarist of the film, he was being touted as a possible new Rudolph Valentino. Nothing came of it. He also appeared on several American variety shows such as Bonanza, Daniel Boone, and The Beverly Hillbillies.

Farming and mentoring
In 1971 he abandoned show business entirely, and he and his Cori set up an organic farm in San Gregorio, California, near Moss Beach. He continued, however, to act as a friend and mentor to many aspiring magicians like James Dimmare. He was also a mentor to Lance Burton.

Death
Pollock died in Las Vegas from complications due to cancer. He was 79 years old, and his wife predeceased him.

References

External links
 
Channing Pollock in Conversation with John Fisher
 
 Interview with Naomi Pollock

1926 births
2006 deaths
Male actors from Sacramento, California
American magicians
American male film actors
Deaths from cancer in Nevada
20th-century American male actors
United States Navy personnel of World War II
Academy of Magical Arts Masters Fellowship winners
Academy of Magical Arts Performing Fellowship winners